Namatjira the Painter is a 1947 documentary about the artist, Albert Namatjira. It deals with his background, his relationship with Rex Battarbee and how he learned to paint.

Production
The film was one of the first productions of the Australian National Film Board (later known as Film Australia). Ralph Foster was the first Film Commissioner appointed to the Board.

Lee Robinson had joined the Board out of the army and wrote a treatment for the documentary in January 1946. Because no one else was experienced as a director, he was given the job. Robinson received basic advice on directing from Harry Watt, then in Australia shooting The Overlanders.

Filming took around five months in mid 1946 in the Northern Territory, finishing in August, and was edited in Ralph Foster's flat. The movie was completed after Stanley Hawes became head of the film board.

Reception
The film was widely screened in cinemas as a support feature. It was re-released in 1974 with new narration.

References

External links
Namatjira the Painter at IMDb
Namatjira the Painter at National Film and Sound Archive
Complete copy of 1974 edition of film at ABC website

Australian documentary films
Documentary films about painters
Documentary films about Aboriginal Australians